Moricsala Nature Reserve is a nature reserve in western Latvia (Courland). It is situated on two islands in Lake Usma and consists of boreal, mixed broad-leaf and oak old-growth forest as well as swamps. Founded in 1912, it is the oldest nature reserve in Latvia. Being a so-called strict nature reserve, entry into the reserve is prohibited except for scientific purposes. The nature reserve serves as a habitat for several rare species of moss, lichen and insects; for example, 222 species of butterflies can be found here. For some of these butterflies, the nature reserve is the only known habitat in the Baltic states.

References

Strict nature reserves in Latvia